Skin & Bones is a book in the Hardy Boys series. It was first published in 2000.

Plot summary
Cody Chang sells such unusual items as animal skulls, fish skeletons and reptile skins at his shop Skin & Bones in San Francisco. He calls on the Hardy Boys to investigate when the shop is ransacked. Frank and Joe suspect a criminal is trying to get revenge on Cody's policeman father by breaking his son's business down, but they have their work cut out to prove it.

Lead characters
 Joe Hardy – the first Hardy brother
 Frank Hardy – the second Hardy brother
 Cody Chang – son of Sergeant Chang and proprietor of Skin & Bones
 Deb – Cody's assistant shopkeeper
 Mike Brando – the first suspect
 Dave – Cody's old dealer

References

The Hardy Boys books
2000 American novels
2000 children's books
Novels set in San Francisco